Run Chrissie Run! (also known as Money Hunters and Moving Targets in the US) is a 1984 Australian action thriller film, directed by Chris Langman. Graham Hartley adapted the script from the novel When We Ran by Keith Leopold.

The film is not connected in any way with the unproduced radio play Run, Chrissie, Run by Fay Weldon.

Plot
Two IRA hitmen are pursuing Riley (Michael Aitkens), because he killed one of their number. Riley is pursuing Eve (Carmen Duncan), a German former terrorist, who is on the run in Australia with her teenage daughter Chrissie (Annie Jones) and the proceeds of an old bank robbery in Germany. The two IRA hitmen, accompanied by an angry biker, track Eve and Chrissie to the Barossa Valley. Riley arrives on the scene in time for an explosive finale.

Cast
Carmen Duncan as Eve
Red Symons as Pitt
Michael Aitkens as Riley
Shane Briant as Terrier
Nicholas Eadie as Toe
Annie Jones as Chrissie
David Clencie as Paul
Peter Stratford as Meyerdahl
Sarah De Teliga as Sue
Simone Buchanan as Cathy
Joanna Moore as Cricket coach

Release
The film was made in 1984 but not screened on Australian TV until 1988.

See also

 Australian films of 1986
 Cinema of Australia
 List of Australian films
 South Australian Film Corporation

References

External links
 
Run Chrissie Run! – South Australian Film Corporation
Run Chrissie Run at Oz Movies

1986 films
Australian drama films
Films set in South Australia
1986 drama films
1980s English-language films
Films directed by Chris Langman
1980s Australian films